This is a list of the Europarade number-one singles of 1959.

Lists of number-one songs in Europe
1959 record charts